Bussell Highway is a generally north–south highway in the South West region of Western Australia. The highway is signed State Route 10, except in Busselton where the construction of the Busselton Bypass in 2000 resulted in this stretch being changed to Alternate State Route 10 with the Bypass signed State Route 10.

The highway is sealed dual carriageway from Bunbury to Capel and in the town of Busselton; and is single carriageway from Capel to Busselton and from Vasse to Augusta with regular overtaking lanes.

History
Bussell Highway was built in 1894 after successful lobbying by M. C. Davies, a timber miller, as a road connecting Busselton with his mill at Karridale. The tender had been let to Davies by the State government under John Forrest. In 1932, the road from Busselton to Augusta was completed and named Bussell Highway after the Bussell family, some of the region's first settlers, on the suggestion of Premier James Mitchell in consultation with historian James Battye; the name, which incorporated a portion of Quindalup Road, was announced on 8 April of that year to coincide with Busselton's centenary celebrations. In 1946 Bunbury Road and Vasse Road were incorporated into Bussell highway, thus extending the highway to Bunbury. By the early 1960s, the road had been completely sealed. In 1995, the Ludlow deviation, a replacement of part of the highway that bypasses the Tuart Forest National Park, was opened; the old route through the forest is now named Tuart Drive. The Busselton Bypass was completed in December 2000, while the Vasse bypass was completed in January 2016.

In 2016, Main Roads asked the local government Shire of Capel to clear land along the final stretch for the proposed dual carriageway between Capel and Busselton.

In 2019, the Perimeter Road, which diverts heavy traffic from Bussell Highway around, rather than through, Margaret River, was completed.

In 2020, funding was brought forward for the dual carriageway to support jobs during the COVID-19 pandemic. The south-bound section of the first of two stages, between Capel and Hutton Road, was opened in December 2021.

Route description
Departing Bunbury, the highway commences at the intersection of Blair Street and Parade Road outside the Bunbury Racecourse in Carey Park.

It exits Bunbury as a sealed dual carriageway, bypassing the town of Capel before becoming a single carriageway to Busselton. This section was considered the most dangerous road in regional Western Australia according to a 2019 survey by the Royal Automobile Club of Western Australia.

At a large roundabout, it intersects with the Busselton Bypass and changes its name to Causeway Road, then turns left into Albert Street in Busselton's CBD.
The road then proceeds as a single carriageway with regular overtaking lanes to Augusta through small dairy and crop farms, orchards and wineries – the only slow point on this entire journey is when it becomes the main street of the popular tourist and seachange town of Margaret River. The linked Perimeter Road bypasses the town.

The highway ends at the entrance to Augusta, but the road continues as Blackwood Avenue through the town and then as Leeuwin Road for  before reaching Cape Leeuwin, the southwestern tip of Western Australia.

Major towns
 Gelorup
 Capel (bypass)
 Busselton
 Broadwater
 Carbunup River
 Cowaramup
 Margaret River
 Witchcliffe
 Karridale
 Kudardup
 Augusta

Major intersections

See also

 Highways in Australia
 List of highways in Western Australia

References

External links

Bussell
Capes region of South West Western Australia